James Hanford may refer to:
 James Madison Hanford, American railroad executive
 James Holly Hanford, professor and author known for his scholarship on John Milton
 Jamie Hanford, American lacrosse player